Luke John Oliver (born 1 May 1984) is an English footballer who last played as a defender for Aldershot Town.

Career
He signed for Wycombe in January 2009 from Stevenage Borough. Either a centre back or centre forward, Oliver is an imposing player in the air and makes good use of his size in both positions, he also shows good skill on the ball and a decent turn of pace. At the beginning of the 2009–10 season Oliver started as first choice centre back alongside captain Michael Duberry after an impressive pre-season, replacing Leon Johnson. Oliver joined Bradford City on a month's loan in March 2010, joining up with manager Peter Taylor once more – who had managed Oliver at both Stevenage Borough and Wycombe. He signed permanently for Bradford on a free transfer at the end of the season.
Oliver was one of five players to be sent off after the post match brawl against Crawley Town on 27 March 2012. He was named Player of the Year on 24 April, receiving 6 awards at the club's annual awards night, including Player's Player of the Year. On 22 June 2012, Oliver signed a new two-year contract with the club, which was promoted to League One at the end of the season.

In January 2014 he left the club by mutual consent. On 3 February 2014, he joined Forest Green Rovers on a deal until the end of the season with an option for a further year. He made his debut for the club on 18 February 2014 in a 2–2 draw with Aldershot Town. Only two days later, on 20 February 2014, he took up the option of extending his contract with the club that would see him commit to Forest Green until the summer of 2015. He scored his first goal for Forest Green on 9 December 2014 with the winning goal against his former club, Woking in a 2–1 home victory. On 4 May 2015, it was confirmed that he was one of six Forest Green players that had been released. He signed for Aldershot Town in the summer of 2015.

Career statistics

References

External links

1984 births
Footballers from Acton, London
Living people
Association football defenders
English footballers
Aldershot Town F.C. players
Wycombe Wanderers F.C. players
Woking F.C. players
Yeovil Town F.C. players
Stevenage F.C. players
Salisbury City F.C. players
Bradford City A.F.C. players
English Football League players
National League (English football) players
Forest Green Rovers F.C. players